Eupithecia vitreotata is a moth in the family Geometridae first described by Samuel E. Cassino in 1927. It is found in the US states of Colorado, Arizona and California.

The wingspan is about 17 mm. The forewings are dark smoky gray with a very thin, upright, black discal streak. The hindwings are dull smoky, deepening outwardly, and with a minute discal dot. Adults have been recorded on wing from February to April.

References

Moths described in 1927
vitreotata
Moths of North America